A Traveler's Guide to Space and Time is a first box set by German power metal band Blind Guardian. It contains 15 CDs and covers the bands discography during the so-called Virgin years, between 1988 and 2004. Along with seven studio albums, two live albums and one compilation album (all of them remastered in 2012 and some remixed), it also includes Imaginations Through the Looking Glass in audio format, a special edition of Nightfall In Middle-Earth and a CD of demos and rarities. It also came with a 20-page glossy booklet, limited and numbered Blind Guardian art print on special paper and a guitar pick with band logo. It is a strictly limited edition, as only 8000 copies were made worldwide.

Track listing

Disc 1: Battalions of Fear
Digitally Remastered 2012

Disc 2: Follow the Blind
Digitally Remastered 2012

Disc 3: Tales from the Twilight World
Digitally Remastered 2012 & New Mix 2012

Disc 4: Somewhere Far Beyond
Digitally Remastered 2012 & New Mix 2012

Disc 5: Tokyo Tales
Original 1993 Mix, Digitally Remastered 2012

Disc 6: Imaginations from the Other Side
Digitally Remastered 2012 & New Mix 2012

Disc 7: The Forgotten Tales
Original Mixes Digitally Remastered 2012

Disc 8: Nightfall in Middle-Earth
Digitally Remastered 2012 & New Mix 2012

Disc 9: A Night at the Opera
Digitally Remastered 2012 & New Mix 2012

Disc 10: Live (CD 1)
Digitally Remastered 2012

Disc 11: Live (CD 2)
Digitally Remastered 2012

Disc 12: Imaginations Through the Looking Glass - Live in Coburg, 2003 (CD 1)
Digitally Remastered 2012

Disc 13: Imaginations Through the Looking Glass - Live in Coburg, 2003 (CD 2)
Digitally Remastered 2012

Disc 14: Nightfall in Middle-Earth – Special Edition
Digitally Remastered 2012 & New Mix 2012

Disc 15: An Extraordinary Tale (Live Rarities & Demos)
Digitally Remastered 2012

Personnel

Band members 
Hansi Kürsch: vocals, bass (discs 1-7, 15), backing vocals (8-9,14)
André Olbrich: lead guitar, rhythm guitar (4,6-9), acoustic guitar (4,6-13), backing vocals (1-5,10-13,15)
Marcus Siepen: rhythm guitar, acoustic guitar (4,10-13), backing vocals (1-5,10-13,15)
Thomas Stauch: drums, percussion

Guest musicians 

Ronnie Atkins: backing vocals (6-7)
Pad Bender: keyboards (9), effects (9)
Norman Eshley: narration (8)
Douglas Fielding: narration (8)
Hans-Peter Frey: drums (1)
Thomas Hackmann: backing vocals (2-3,6-9,14)
Kai Hansen: vocals (2-3), lead guitar (2-4), backing vocals (3)
Alex Holzwarth: drums (10-11)
Oliver Holzwarth: bass (8-14), backing vocals (10-13)
Billy King: backing vocals (4,6-9,14)
Rolf Köhler: vocals (2,7), backing vocals (1-4,6-9,14)
Aman Malek: backing vocals (2,7)
Jacob Moth: acoustic guitar (6-7)
Sascha Pierro: keyboards (9), effects (9)
Peter Rübsam: bagpipes (4)
Boris Schmidt: keyboards (9), effects (9)
Olaf Senkbeil: backing vocals (8-9,14)
Michael Shüren: piano (7-9,14), keyboards (10-13), backing vocals (10-13)
Otto Sidenius: organ (7)
Piet Sielck: backing vocals (3,7), effects (3-4,7), guitars (4)
Christof Theisen: rhythm guitar (1)
Kalle Trapp: vocals (2,7), lead guitar (2,7), backing vocals (3-4,7)
Michael Voss: backing vocals (1)
Matthias Wiesner: keyboards (2-4,8-9,14) effects (3-4,6-9,14) bass (4,7)
Stefan Will: piano (4,7)
Marc Zee: keyboards (5), backing vocals (5)
Max Zelzner: flutes (8)

References

External links 
 
 
Tracklisting at discogs.com
Tracklisting at last.fm

Blind Guardian albums
2013 compilation albums